Edward Burnicle (1890–1931) was an Australian rugby league footballer who played in the 1910s and 1920s.

Playing career
Born at Paddington, New South Wales to parents Henry and Elizabeth Burnicle, Burnicle played for Balmain for four years between 1915 and 1918, and he also played one season for Western Suburbs in 1921. The highlight of his career was winning a premiership with Balmain, playing prop forward in the 1916 Grand Final.  He also played for Balmain when the club won the premiership in 1915 and 1917.

Death
Burnicle died on 18 February 1931, at Five Dock, New South Wales as a result of an accident.

References

1890 births
1931 deaths
Balmain Tigers players
Australian rugby league players
Rugby league props
Rugby league players from Sydney
Western Suburbs Magpies players